The Academia de Genealogía y Heráldica Mota-Padilla (Academy of Genealogy and Heraldry Mota-Padilla) was a cultural institution based in Guadalajara, Jalisco, the second largest city in Mexico. According with an article published in the Genealogical Journal (1971), this institution was the first genealogical association in Latin America.

History
It was established on 12 January 1920 by Salvador Mota-Velasco y Abad (1855–1923); it was erected in memory of the first Historian of the former Kingdom of Nueva Galicia (New Galicia) in the Viceroyalty of New Spain, Matías Angel de la Mota Padilla (1688–1766), author of Historia de la Conquista del Reino de la Nueva Galicia (1741); among its members, the very same Salvador Mota-Velasco y Abad was a direct descendant of the after mentioned author. 
This institution was privately funded and led by enthusiasts of the Genealogical and Heraldic Sciences whose main purpose was to promote the creation of a study about the history of the municipality of Unión de Tula, Jalisco, with a genealogical and heraldic research of the four founding families of that place, which were the Topete, the Villaseñor, the Lazcano and the Arriola families (the name of the place was originated through their initials: T V L A). With the passing of time, the Academia's objectives went beyond the original idea, promoting any kind of Genealogical and Heraldic studies, then, more enthusiasts became members of this institution. They gathered monthly and produced some interesting works, like those published by journalist Alberto Santoscoy or by historian José R. Benítez; unfortunately, some of those papers are still unpublished.

Founding members
The founding members were five: Salvador Mota-Velasco y Abad (1855–1923), José Ignacio Dávila Garibi (1888–1981), Jorge Verea y Vallarta (1877–1958), Enrique Eduardo López Maldonado († 1938), and Alberto Santoscoy (1857–1906).

Academia's structure in 1920
Board of Directors
 José Francisco Orozco y Jiménez, Honorary President
 Salvador Mota-Velasco y Abad, President
 Enrique Eduardo López Maldonado, Vice President
 José Ignacio Dávila Garibi, General Secretary
 Jorge Verea y Vallarta, 2nd Secretary & Treasurer

Founders Academicians in 1920

(alphabetical order)
 José Ascenio Zavala
 José R. Benítez
 Cesáreo L. González
 Francisco Medina de la Torre
 Leopoldo I. Orendain
 Luis Robles Martínez
 Alberto Santoscoy
 José Villa Gordoa
 José Villaseñor Plancarte

Reorganization
After most of its original members died, the institution became less active; then, Jorge Verea y Vallarta's nephew, Ricardo Lancaster-Jones y Verea, reorganized it between 1950–53, it was formally re-established with an act dated on 8 May 1953. After Lancaster-Jones y Verea's death in 1983, the institution became extinct.

Presidents

Academia's structure after 1950
Board of Directors:
 
 José Ignacio Dávila Garibi, Honorary President
 Luis León de la Barra y García-Abello, Honorary Vice President
 Ricardo Lancaster-Jones y Verea, President
 Jesús Garibi Velasco, Vice President & General Secretary
 Leopoldo I. Orendain, Treasurer
 Carlos Stahl, Vice Treasurer

Honorary Academicians:

 Cardinal Jose Garibi y Rivera, Primate of Mexico and Archbishop of Guadalajara
 Cardinal József Mindszenty, Primate of Hungary and Archbishop of Budapest
 Cardinal Manuel Arteaga y Betancourt, Primate of Cuba and Archbishop of Havana
 Archduke Eugen of Austria
 Archduke Joseph of Austria
 Jacobo Fitz-James Stuart, 17th Duke of Alba and Berwick, Grandee of Spain

Counsultant Academicians:
 
 Alfonso Reyes, Literature
 Juan B. Iguíniz, Bibliography
 Ignacio Bernal, History
 José R. Benítez, History
 Lucas de Palacio, Heraldry
 Priest Alfredo Ochoa, Religious Heraldry
 Col. Rafael F. Muñoz, Military Heraldry
 Vicente de Cadenas y Vicent, Spanish Genealogy & Heraldry
 Faustino Menéndez Pidal de Navascués, Spanish History
 Juan de Adarraga, Etymology & Linguistics
 Gabriel García-Rojas y Pérez de Salazar, Law & Legal Affairs
 Antonio Pérez-Verdía y Fernández, Law & Legal Affairs
 Manuel Sandoval Vallarta, Government & International Affairs
 Daniel Escalante, Protocol

Patrons:

Companies:
 Banco Industrial de Jalisco
 Banco Refaccionario de Jalisco
 Ingenio San Francisco de Ameca
 Ingenio Santa Cruz y El Cortijo
 Ingenio Tamazula
Individuals:
 Miguel Alfaro
 Félix Díaz Garza
 Xavier García de Quevedo y Castaños
 Aurelio González de Hermosillo y Brizuela
 José López-Portillo y Romo de Vivar

Publications
The Academia de Genealogía y Heráldica Mota-Padilla published three volumes of Anuario (1943, 1955, 1957) and a Lista de Miembros y Estatutos (1955).

Archdiocese of Guadalajara's genealogical records
This institution contributed with the Church of Jesus Christ of Latter-day Saints and with the Academia Mexicana de Genealogía y Heráldica, during the microfilming process of the complete and well preserved Archdiocese of Guadalajara's records (1953–71). Nowadays, a copy of these microfilms are located in the Archivo General de la Nación in Mexico City, and are available for public consultation under the guidelines and regulations of the same institution.

References

Main references

 
 
 
 
 
 
 

Mexican heraldry
Jalisco
Guadalajara, Jalisco
History institutes
Organizations established in 1920
History organizations based in Mexico
Genealogical societies